Diaphus phillipsi, the Bolin's lantern fish, is a species of lanternfish 
found in the Indo-Pacific.

Size

Etymology
The fish is named in honor of the late Dr. Richard J. Phillips of Philadelphia, who collected many of the local fishes for Fowler.

References

Myctophidae
Taxa named by Henry Weed Fowler
Fish described in 1934